North Uxbridge is a village and a post office in the town (township) of Uxbridge in Worcester County, Massachusetts, United States. The postal zip code is 01538. North Uxbridge appears on the Uxbridge U.S. Geological Survey Map. Worcester County is in the Eastern time zone (GMT -5) and observes DST. North Uxbridge is located about 36 miles WSW of Boston, and 15 miles SE of Worcester. The town meeting in 1885 set aside North Uxbridge as a "special district", since its population had exceeded 1000 people. North Uxbridge appeared to be a separate Census tract in the 1960 census with a population of 1882. In 2013, an Uxbridge DIY show, The Garage, with Steve Butler, went worldwide from Steve's garage in North Uxbridge.

Description of the village
North Uxbridge, the main northern village of the town, is also known as the "north end". The village receives municipal services from Uxbridge, for fire, police, emergency medical services, school district, public works, and other services. Worcester's Judicial District includes Uxbridge District Court. There is a North Uxbridge fire station Number 2, of the Uxbridge Fire Department. The commercial district includes a CVS pharmacy, small shops, businesses and restaurants. The Cornerstone Church (the former North Uxbridge Baptist Church) is a well known icon in the downtown area of the village. The village is no longer recognized as a separate census-designated place but is considered part of Uxbridge by the US Census bureau. Major employers include the local school district, and a commercial plastics manufacturing company in the former Rivulet mill. Residential construction has grown substantially in the last 20 years. The former North Uxbridge elementary school was also the Virginia Blanchard Pre-K Center, and is a historic building.

Historic features
The village is home to the historic Rogerson Village built by Robert Rogerson in the 1820s. This village contains the Crown and Eagle Mills, considered an architectural masterpiece of an early New England mill village with worker housing and a water-powered cotton mill. This system of water-powered mills, driven by dams, with spillways, and surrounded by mill villages, became known as "The Rhode Island System". North Uxbridge had other historic mills such as the Rivulet Mill and Richard Sayles Mills, originally built by Chandler Taft in 1814, and the Clapp Mill (1810). Blanchard School and a number of other historic sites here such as Samuel Taft House, and the A. Whipple House, are listed on the Federal Register of historic places. It was also home to the Blanchard Granite quarry from which was mined large quantities of granite known throughout the Eastern United States. Blanchard's quarry supplied Boston's reconstruction after its 1872 fire and sold New York City its curbstones. The North Uxbridge School, or Virginia A. Blanchard School, is on the register of Historic Places (see also below), as is the Rogerson's Village. The village is part of the Blackstone River Valley National Heritage Corridor of Massachusetts and Rhode Island which is part of the National Park Service. The Blackstone River Valley is the oldest industrialized region in the United States. North Uxbridge borders Linwood and Northbridge. Mendon is to the East. Douglas is to the west. French Canadian Linwood's cotton mill and Robert Rogerson' masterpiece Crown and Eagle Cotton Mill were near Italian North Uxbridge's Rivulet Mill.

Recent history
In the late 20th century, the former James Whitin Estate, also known as "GrayRock", served as an exclusive substance abuse treatment facility. Famous individuals receiving treatment included Joan Kennedy (the first wife of the late US Massachusetts Senator Ted Kennedy), and actress Amanda Blake, (who played Miss Kitty, on Gunsmoke). This estate burned in a major fire a few years later and is today the location of Fire Station Number 2, of the Uxbridge Fire Department.

Government
See Uxbridge for Local Government Town website uxbridge-ma.gov

Industrial era photos

See also
 List of mill towns in Massachusetts

Local links
 List of Registered Historic Places in Uxbridge, Massachusetts, Lists buildings relevant to this village
 
 Town of Uxbridge Massachusetts, official website

References 

Uxbridge, Massachusetts
Villages in Worcester County, Massachusetts
History of the textile industry
Villages in Massachusetts